Louis IV, Count Palatine of the Rhine (1 January 1424, Heidelberg – 13 August 1449, Worms) was an Elector Palatine of the Rhine from the House of Wittelsbach in 1436 - 1449.

Biography
Louis IV was the son of Louis III, Elector Palatine and his second wife Matilda of Savoy. His mother was a fourth-generation descendant of Thomas III of Piedmont (1248 - 1282), the eldest son of Thomas II of Savoy.

From the death of Louis III in 1436 until 1442, Louis IV ruled under guardianship of his uncle, Count Palatine Otto I of Mosbach. In 1444 he repelled the attacks of the Armagnacs as an Imperial captain.

In 1445 he married Margarete of Savoy, widow of king Louis III of Naples and daughter of Duke Amadeus VIII of Savoy. With her, he had his only son, Philipp (14 July 1448 – 28 February 1508). When Louis died in 1449, aged 25 years, in Worms, his brother Frederick inherited the Palatinate. Louis was buried in the Holy Spirit church of Heidelberg.

References

External links
  genealogie-mittelalter.de

1424 births
1449 deaths
Nobility from Heidelberg
Imperial vicars
House of Wittelsbach
Prince-electors of the Palatinate
Medieval child monarchs
Burials at the Church of the Holy Spirit, Heidelberg
15th-century people of the Holy Roman Empire